St. Paul's School is an independent boarding school for boys in the town of Darjeeling, West Bengal, India. It is known as "Eton of the East" because it is thought to follow the similar cultural and traditional values of Eton College. St. Paul's is one of the oldest public schools in Asia. Entrance tests for admission are held every September. The school follows the ICSE curriculum until class 10 and the ISC curriculum for classes 11 and 12.

History

St. Paul's School was founded on 1 May 1823 in Calcutta by Archdeacon Corrie at the instigation of John William Ricketts, a local Anglo-Indian leader. The first principal of the institution was Dr George Smith. Originally located at 11 Park Street, between the Archbishop House and the then Sans Souci Theatre, in 1830 it moved to Jawaharlal Nehru Road to the area now occupied by the Indian Museum. In 1847, it was renamed St. Paul's School by Bishop Wilson, who had associated the school with St. Paul's Cathedral in Calcutta.It moved to its present Jalapahar estate in Darjeeling in 1864 with 31 boarders and a few day scholars. The estate was purchased from Brian Hodgson for Rs.45,000. At that time, at approximately 7,600 feet above sea level, it was the highest school in the world.

A number of its students fought in World War I and World War II.

The school's original purpose was "to supply a good education at a moderate cost to the sons of Europeans and East Indians". After Indian Independence in 1947 it became a school for wealthy Indians and attracted wealthy students from other Asian countries.

Bishop Foss Westcott, metropolitan of Bengal, Burma and Ceylon, played an important role in the growth of the school. The Maharajah of Burdwan also made important donations. Over the years a number of estates were purchased and merged with the existing school estate. The Mount Vernon Estate, known as Dawkins, was purchased in the early 1900s, and the Terpsithea Estate in 1955.

L.J. Goddard was the longest serving and perhaps the most important rector, leading the school between 1934 and 1964, including the transition from British-ruled to independent India. His successors were David Gibbs (1964–72) and Hari Dang (1977-84). Dang was awarded the Padma Shri in 1976 for his services in education. Goddard and Gibbs received the OBE for their work at St. Paul's.

School system
The school is divided into Primary, Junior, and Senior wings. The three wings are run independently with the Primary Wing having its own campus and a slight difference in uniform. The Senior and Junior Wings share many facilities.

The Rector is the head of the school, assisted by the Senior Master, Head Junior Wing, Head Primary Wing and House masters.

Culture
The school currently presents itself as an residential school for boys, predominantly Indian with an "international, multiracial and cross-regional cosmopolitan character", having students from many countries including the US, the UK, France, Thailand, Bhutan, Japan, Bangladesh, Nepal, United Arab Emirates, and Hong Kong.

Current students are referred to as Paulites and the alumni as Old Paulites. The school lays a great emphasis on uniforms. On off-campus trips students must dress in prescribed suits and carry umbrellas.

The school motto is derived from the passage 'Cedamus Phoebo, et moniti meliora sequamur' in the Latin epic the Aeneid by Virgil. 'Moniti meliora sequamur' means "Having Been Advised, We Follow Better (Higher) Things".

The student government is headed by a school captain, assisted by House Captains and Prefects, drawn from the sixth form. The Junior and Primary Wings have their own system of monitors. The sixth form is privileged and enjoys an advantage over the rest. The chapel holds a central place in the life of the school where it meets as a community. There are clubs which develop artistic and technical skills. Each house presents a concert from time to time, apart from the major school production in October.

The extracurricular activities in school are dramatics, elocution, debate, piano, guitar, drums, violin, marching band and sitar classes. There are various hobby clubs and societies. These are all run by the boys under the supervision of masters. In the senior wing, the hobbies are art and craft, Batik, Indian Western music, model-making, photography, wood and lathe work, cybernetics, textile design, and cooking. The school sends candidates for the music and speech examinations held by the Trinity College London and Royal Academy of Music. The boys are also sent on educational tours to NASA and other historical sites in India and neighbouring countries.

The sport curriculum is dominated by football, cricket, athletics, volleyball, basketball, squash, table tennis, tennis, Eton fives, gymnastics, rocking climbing.

Awards and recognition
St Paul's has been ranked first among boarding schools in West Bengal and fourth in India according to the 2019 Education-World rankings. The school was featured in Forbes India magazine in the article "The great Indian Schools - 2018". It was named among the top seven boarding schools in India in 2020 by India Today.

Gallery

Notable alumni

 Prithvi Raj Singh Oberoi - Executive Chairman of EIH Hotels, The Oberoi Group; Padma Vibhushan
 Major General D K Palit - Vir Chakra recipient for commanding the 9th Gorkha Rifles, author
 Rustum Roy - physicist in the field of chemistry and materials sciences with 21 nominations for the Nobel Prize; awarded with Order of the Rising Sun by the Emperor of Japan
 Rehman Sobhan - Bangladeshi economist and freedom fighter
 Ammar Siamwalla - Thai economist, former President of Thailand Development Research Institute, author
 Samiran Nundy - founder editor of the National Medical Journal of India and Tropical Gastroenterology, recipient of India's Padma Shri
 Frank Blaker - Victoria Cross recipient; in 3rd Battalion, 9th Gurkha Rifles, the khas battalion in the Indian Army during World War II
 Farooq Sobhan - diplomat, Foreign Secretary of Bangladesh
 Lalat Indu Parija - IAS, former Chief Secretary of Odisha, Author and Captained Odisha cricket team in the Ranji Trophy.
 S.V.S Juneja - IAS, former Joint Secretary and Additional Secretary in the union finance ministry, former Director (Infrastructure Department) at the Asian Development Bank
 Sanjib Banerjee - Chief Justice of Madras High Court
 Subroto Roy (economist)- Indian economist, former economic advisor to late Rajiv Gandhi
 Anand Burman - Indian businessman, chairman of Dabur
 Ajay Chhibber - first Director General of India's Independent Evaluation Office (with the status of a union Minister of State), former Assistant Secretary-General of the United Nations (UN), head of the Asia-Pacific division of the UNDP
 Karun Krishna Majumdar - during World War II, the first Indian to achieve the rank of wing commander in the Indian Air Force
 Mahesh Jethmalani - lawyer and senior council, Supreme Court of India and senior member of BJP Party.
 Manish Choudhary - Bollywood actor
 A R Shamsud Doha - Bangladesh Minister of Foreign Affairs, former Ambassador to Yugoslavia, Iran and the United Kingdom; former Minister for Information
 James McMullan - artist, illustrator, educator; received Drama Desk Special Award in 1991 and Hamilton King Award

 R. J. Minney - British film producer, journalist, editor and author
 Kelly Dorji - actor and author
 Anjan Dutt - Indian film director, actor, and singer-songwriter
 George Emmett - test cricketer for England, Captain of the Gloucestershire cricket team, 1955–1958
 Kaizad Gustad - Bollywood director and author
 Peter Hildreth - Olympian
 Paul Raschid - Olympian in boxing
 Sharad Kumar - Paralympic Games high jumper, Olympian
 Rajeev Mohta - team gold medalist and individual silver medalist in golf at the 1982 Asian Games
 Sidkeong Tulku Namgyal-Maharaja and Chogyal of Sikkim
 Tashi Namgyal - longest-reigning Chogyal (king) of Sikkim (r. 1914-63), who signed the 1950 treaty giving India suzerainty over Sikkim
 Jamling Tenzing Norgay - mountain climber, author, recipient of National Citizen award
 Vishnu Som - senior editor and principal anchor with New Delhi Television
 Tashi Tenzing - mountain climber
 Swapan Dasgupta - columnist, Member of Parliament, Padma Bhushan

Films shot at St. Paul's School 

The school has been featured in Hindi and Bengali language films including Hamraaz (1967) by B. R. Chopra, Mera Naam Joker (1970) by Raj Kapoor, Seemabaddha (1971) by Satyajit Ray, Do Anjaane (1976) by Dulal Guha, Bada Din (2000), Main Hoon Na (2004) by Farah Khan, Chowrasta Crossroads of Love (2009) by Anjan Dutta, Barfi! (2012), Jagga Jasoos (2017) by Anurag Basu, Raja the Great (2017) by Anil Ravipudi, Petta (2019) by Karthik Subbaraj, and Mithya (2022) by Rohan Sippy.

Hollywood actress Vivien Leigh was born on the school campus in November 1913.

See also
 Education in India
 Education in West Bengal
 List of schools in India

References

External links

 
 St. Paul's School, Official, Darjeeling
 St Paul's School Official Darj (@st_pauls_school_official) • Instagram photos and videos
 St Paul's School Officials Darjeeling - YouTube
 St. Paul's School, Darjeeling, India collection
 St. Paul's School, Darjeeling, India collection

Church of North India schools
Boys' schools in India
Christian schools in West Bengal
Boarding schools in West Bengal
Primary schools in West Bengal
High schools and secondary schools in West Bengal
Schools in Darjeeling district
Education in Darjeeling
Educational institutions established in 1823
1823 establishments in India